Nordfold-Kjerringøy or Nordfold og Kjerringøy is a former municipality in Nordland county, Norway.  The  municipality existed from 1887 until its dissolution in 1906. The municipality covered the area surrounding the entrance to the large Folda fjord plus the area surrounding the northern branch of that fjord.  It included the southern part of what is now Steigen Municipality, the northern part of the present-day Bodø Municipality, and the northern part of what is now Sørfold Municipality.

History
The municipality of Nordfold-Kjerringøy was established on 1 January 1887, when the municipality of Folden was split into two new municipalities: Nordfold-Kjerringøy and Sørfold.  Initially, Nordfold-Kjerringøy had a population of 1,347. On 1 January 1894, the Movik farm (population: 30) on the north side of the Sagfjorden was moved administratively from Nordfold-Kjerringøy Municipality to the neighboring Sørfold Municipality. On 1 January 1906, Nordfold-Kjerringøy ceased to exist when it was split into two new municipalities: Nordfold and Kjerringøy. Before the partition, Nordfold-Kjerringøy had a population of 2,342.

Name
The municipality was given a compound name made up of the two areas that made up the municipality: Nordfold and Kjerringøy.

The first part is named after the local Folda fjord. The first element is the prefix  which means "Northern". The inner part of the fjord is divided into two arms Nordfolda ("the northern Folda") and Sørfolda ("the southern Folda"). 

The second part is named after the old Kjerringøy farm since the first Kjerringøy Church was built there.

Government
During its existence, this municipality was governed by a municipal council of elected representatives, which in turn elected a mayor.

Mayors
The mayors of Nordfold-Kjerringøy:

 1887–1892: Ernst Kristian Gladsjø
 1893–1898: Peter Gylseth
 1899–1904: Peder Nilssen-Fjære
 1905-1905: Peter Gylseth

See also
List of former municipalities of Norway

References

Former municipalities of Norway
Bodø
Steigen
Sørfold
1887 establishments in Norway
1906 disestablishments in Norway